The flag of Quebec, called the , represents the Canadian province of Quebec. It consists of a white cross on a blue background, with four white fleurs-de-lis.

It was the first provincial flag officially adopted in Canada and was originally shown on January 21, 1948, at the Parliament Building in Quebec City, during the administration of Maurice Duplessis. Legislation governing its usage was enacted on March 9, 1950.  Quebec's Flag Day (January 21) commemorates its adoption each year, although for some time it was celebrated in May.

Status 

Article 2 of the Act respecting the flag and emblems of Québec confers the status of national emblem on the flag of Quebec.

Symbolism 

The  takes its white cross from certain French flags of the Kingdom of France, namely the French naval flag as well as the French merchant flag. Its white fleurs-de-lis (symbolizing purity) and blue field (symbolizing heaven) come from a banner honouring the Virgin Mary; such banners were carried by Canadian colonial militia in the 18th century. The flag is blazoned Azure, a cross between four fleurs-de-lis argent. Its horizontal symmetry allows both sides of the flag to show the same image.

Bourbon flag
The royal banner of France or  "Bourbon flag" was the first and most commonly used flag in New France. The banner has three gold fleurs-de-lis on a dark blue field (arranged two and one), and it was also present on the French naval flag.

Protocol 

The flag's official ratio is 2:3 (width to length), but the flag is very often seen as a 1:2 variant to match the flag of Canada in size when flying together.

The Act respecting the flag and emblems of Québec states that "in all cases, the flag of Quebec has precedence over any other flag or emblem."  However, under federal protocol, the Canadian flag takes precedence when both are flown.

The official shade of blue is Pantone 293. In 8-bit RGB, it is #003399. Unofficial variants using a lighter blue are common.

Vertical display 
The canton (top left quarter) must always be to the viewer's left.

History 

The desire of Quebecers for a distinctive flag was longstanding. Other flags that had been used included the  flag (a horizontal green, white and red tricolour, which became the flag of the Saint-Jean-Baptiste Society), as well as the French tricolour.

The direct predecessor of the modern  was created by Elphège Filiatrault, a parish priest in Saint-Jude, Quebec. It was based on an earlier flag with no cross, and with the figure of the Virgin Mary in the centre.

The Carillon flag was first raised on September 26, 1902, and it is preserved in the archives of Saint-Hyacinthe, Quebec. Another version, with the Sacred Heart in the centre, also appeared, but it was left behind in the push for a new provincial flag after World War II. The Carillon flags were used informally.

On May 26, 1868, Queen Victoria approved Quebec's first coat of arms. A flag might have been devised by using the arms to deface a blue ensign (a Union Flag in the canton, and the Quebec coat of arms in the fly). However, it appears to have never been used — various sources including the official Quebec government site mention that it was the Union Flag that flew over the Parliament Building until January 21, 1948, not the blue ensign. In addition, in 1938, at the opening of a mining school in Val-d'Or, the flag used to represent the Quebec government was a banner of arms. This was done at the behest of public servant Burroughs Pelletier, who had been told that the Ministry wanted a symbol but were unsure as to what should be used.

In 1947, an independent member of the Legislative Assembly, René Chaloult, demanded a new provincial flag to displace the unpopular (amongst some segment of the population of Quebec) Canadian Red Ensign and to replace the neglected Quebec blue ensign. Various ideas were discussed between Chaloult, Lionel Groulx and Maurice Duplessis. One such idea involved incorporating a red maple leaf (later to be adopted for the flag of Canada). Burroughs Pelletier was also asked to present a few proposals to Duplessis, none of which were adopted. He was however consulted about what became the present design.

On January 21, 1948, the new flag was adopted and was flown over the Parliament Building that very afternoon. Apparently, it was the Carillon flag that flew that day, because the modern  (with the fleurs-de-lis repositioned upright to their modern configuration in correspondence with the rules of heraldry) was not available until February 2.

Opposition leader Adélard Godbout expressed his approval, as did René Chaloult. A law governing the usage of the flag was later officially adopted by the Quebec Parliament on March 9, 1950. A more recent version of such a law was adopted in 2002.

Likewise, the flag is highly popular in Quebec, and it is often seen displayed at many private residences and commercial buildings.

The flag of Quebec has a close resemblance to both the French Châlons-en-Champagne city coat of arms and the Spanish Morcín municipality flag, which use similar (though unrelated) designs but with differing colours.

The flag of Quebec was the basis for the jerseys of the Quebec Nordiques, which included the same colour blue, the fleurs-de-lis and white stripes.

See also

 Coat of arms of Quebec
 List of Canadian provincial and territorial symbols
 Symbols of Quebec
 Timeline of Quebec history

Notes

References

In English 
 ANQ. "An Act respecting the Flag and emblems of Québec", in CanLII. Federation of Law Societies of Canada, Updated to 1 May 2008
 MRIQ. "Québec flag protocol", in the site of the Ministère des Relations internationales, 2006
 Fraser, Alistair B. "Chapter XV: Quebec", in The Flags of Canada, January 30, 1998

In French 
 Gouvernement du Québec. "Le fleurdelisé : reflet de notre histoire en Amérique ", in the site Drapeau et symboles nationaux of the Government of Quebec, updated on January 14, 2008
 Le Drapeau national: historique et protocole d'utilisation. [Québec, Qué.]: Relations avec les citoyens et immigration, Gouvernement du Québec, 2001. N.B.: Imprint and date appear on a sticker at end of the document.
 Bouvier, Luc. "Histoire des drapeaux québécois: du tricolore canadien au fleurdelisé québécois ", in HeraldicAmerica  (first published in l'Héraldique au Canada in 1994 and L'Action nationale in 1996)
 Tremblay, Joël and Gaudreau, Serge. "21 janvier 1948 – Adoption par l'Assemblée législative du fleurdelisé comme drapeau officiel du Québec", in Bilan du siècle, Université de Sherbrooke, May 18, 2005
 Bureau de normalisation du Québec (2004). Drapeau du Québec, Sainte-Foy: Bureau de normalisation du Québec, 24 pages
 Gouvernement du Québec (1998). Le cinquantième anniversaire du fleurdelisé, Québec: Commission de la Capitale nationale du Québec, 23 pages
 Bizier, Hélène-Andrée, Claude Paulette, Fleur de lys : d'hier à aujourd'hui, Montréal : Art global, 1997, 152 pages
 Robitaille, René (August 1983). Le Drapeau de Carillon réalité historique ou légende, Québec: Société Saint-Jean-Baptiste de Québec, 34 pages
 Archambault, Jacques et Eugénie Lévesque, Le Drapeau québécois, Québec: Éditeur officiel du Québec, 1974, 78 pages
 BnQ (1973). Bibliographie sur le drapeau du Québec: le fleurdelysé, Bibliothèque nationale du Québec (Centre bibliographique)
 Magnan, Charles-Joseph (1939). Le Carillon-Sacré-Coeur, drapeau national des Canadiens français, Québec : l'Action catholique, 44 pages (edition digitized by the BAnQ)

External links 

 
 Proposals for a flag of Quebec, 1900–1902
 Proposals for a flag of Quebec, 1903–1904 (various versions of the Carillon flag)
 Arms and flag of Quebec in the online Public Register of Arms, Flags and Badges

 
Q
Provincial symbols of Quebec
Quebec
Quebec